Business-driven development is a meta-methodology for developing IT solutions that directly satisfy business requirements. This is achieved by adopting a model-driven approach that starts with the business strategy, requirements and goals, and then refines and transforms them into an IT solution. The transformation is partially achieved by applying model transformations. Due to the alignment of the business layer and the IT layer, it is possible to propagate changes of the business automatically to the IT systems. This leads to increased flexibility and shorter turnaround times when changing the business and adapting the IT systems.

Business-driven development goes further than the simple development of delivered requirements in that the implementing resource seeks to both completely understand the business side during the iterative gathering and implementing of requirements and drives to, once acquiring that information, improve business processes itself during the development of the actual solution. 

The applicability of automatic models transformations to align business and IT has been criticized and partially replaced by agile practices and methods such as behavior-driven development (BDD) and domain-driven design (DDD).

See also
 Behavior-driven development (BDD)
 Business process automation
 Business process management (BPM)
 Domain-driven design (DDD)
 Domain-specific modeling (DSM)
 Model-driven engineering (MDE)
 Service-oriented architecture (SOA)
 Service-oriented modeling Framework (SOMF)
 Workflow

References

Software development process